Finkin Street Chapel is a Grade II listed building in Grantham, Lincolnshire. The Wesleyan Methodist chapel was built in 1840 and was the childhood church of Margaret Thatcher, former Prime Minister of the United Kingdom.

The chapel has a lectern dedicated to Thatcher's father, Alfred Roberts, who was a local preacher there.

In 2008, the congregation of the Central Methodist Church, Finkin Street joined with the congregation of St Peter's Hill United Reformed Church in Castlegate to form a local ecumenical partnership,  ChristChurch Grantham.  A decision was then taken in April 2011 to keep the Methodist premises on Finkin Street and sell the URC premises on Castlegate. The congregation meeting weekly in the chapel is now known as ChristChurch.

References

External links
Grantham, Christ Church Finkin Street Wesleyan Methodist Chapel, Lincolnshire – My Wesleyan Methodists
ChristChurch, Grantham website

Methodist churches in Lincolnshire
Buildings and structures in Grantham
19th-century Methodist church buildings
Churches completed in 1840
19th-century churches in the United Kingdom
Grade II listed churches in Lincolnshire